Naifeh may refer to:

Jimmy Naifeh, speaker of the Tennessee House of Representatives
Steven Naifeh, author
Ted Naifeh, cartoonist
Alfred Naifeh, lieutenant in the US Navy, namesake of the USS Naifeh
Marion Naifeh, author
Ali H. Nayfeh, engineer
Munir Nayfeh, physicist